Tadashi Sasaki (* 3 March 1943) is a classical guitarist born in Tokyo, Japan. Today he lives in Germany, where he is a professor at "Hochschule für Musik Köln - Standort Aachen" in Aachen.

In 1968, Tadashi Sasaki was the first Japanese to win the international guitar competition in Paris. He served as a juror in the Heinsberg International Guitar Festival and Competition in 2005.

External links
Tadashi Sasaki. Official site.
Hochschule für Musik Köln - Standort Aachen
:de:Hans-Werner Huppertz

Japanese classical guitarists
Year of birth missing (living people)
Living people
Hochschule für Musik und Tanz Köln alumni

Musicians from Tokyo
Japanese guitarists
Guitarists